Rhynchospora gracillima is a widespread species of sedge.

Description 
The 3-angled culms are smooth and densely tufted. The leaves are shorter than the culms and have stiff hairs. The bracts have longitudinal grooves and sheath the leaves and culms.

The inflorescences are loosely branched. They are made of one to three clusters, with the outer flowers borne on longer stems than the central ones. The rays are smooth and often curve upwards. They are by supported by bristled bractlets. The solitary spikelets are narrow, elongated ovals. They have three or four flowers and long stems. There are seven or eight pale brownish glumes with purplish lines. They overlap and spiral. There are two stamens and two well-developed style branches per floret.

The morphology of the spikelets has been studied in more detail in Rhynchospora gracillima subsp. subquadrata. While there are usually seven or eight glumes, some specimens may have many as eleven. The central glumes (glumes four to nine) are the largest and best developed. They are noticably spiraled with the internodes being enlarged, curved and flattened in order to accommodate the seeds. Glumes five to nine usually mature to form seeds, with glumes five, ten and eleven sometimes forming seeds. Glumes one through four are always infertile.

The fruit is a greyish white nutlet. It is biconvex with deep, wavy ridges.

Distribution and habitat 
This species has two subspecies. Rhynchospora gracillima subsp. gracillima is found growing from Asia to Oceania while Rhynchospora gracillima subsp. subquadrata grows in Africa, Madagascar and Mauritius. It grows in moist places, grassy slopes and forests.

Rhynchospora gracillima is known to grow in Australia, Benin, Burkina Faso, Cameroon, the Central African Republic, China, Congo, the Democratic Republic of the Congo, Eswatini, Ethiopia, Gabon, Ghana, Guinea, India, Indonesia, Ivory Coast, Liberia, Madagascar, Mali, Nigeria, Papua New Guinea, Senegal, South Africa, Sri Lanka, Tanzania, Thailand, Togo, Uganda, Zambia and Zimbabwe. It is also suspected to occur in Angola, Burundi, Chad, Equatorial Guinea, Guinea-Bissau, Malawi, Mozambique, Rwanda, Sierra Leone, South Sudan and The Gambia.

Conservation 
This species is considered to be of least concern by the IUCN. It is widely distributed, and its population is stable.

References 

gracillima
Plants described in 1864
Flora of Australia
Flora of Benin
Flora of Burkina Faso
Flora of Cameroon
Flora of the Central African Republic
Flora of China
Flora of the Democratic Republic of the Congo
Flora of Swaziland
Flora of Ethiopia
Flora of Gabon
Flora of Ghana
Flora of Guinea
Flora of India
Flora of Indonesia
Flora of Ivory Coast
Flora of Liberia
Flora of Madagascar
Flora of Mali
Flora of Nigeria
Flora of Papua New Guinea
Flora of South Africa
Flora of Sri Lanka
Flora of Tanzania
Flora of Thailand
Flora of Togo
Flora of Uganda
Flora of Zambia
Flora of Zimbabwe